Francis Forde (1718–1770) was born in Seaforde in Ireland in about 1718. He was the seventh son of Mathew Forde MP of Seaforde, Co. Down. He entered Trinity College Dublin in 1734 and left with a B.A. in 1738. Adopting a military career, he joined Colonel Aldercron's 39th Regiment as a British army officer who served in India with Robert Clive during the eighteenth century.

Early Indian Service
He first arrived in India in the mid-1740s during the War of the Austrian Succession. By 1746 he was a Captain in the 39th Regiment of Foot. In 1755 at the request of Clive he resigned his commission in the regular British Army to take up a post in the British East India Company's forces. He was soon the British second in command in Bengal following the Battle of Calcutta. He served with Clive in the subsequent Battle of Plassey. On the first anniversary he threw a major party in honour of the victory.

Masulipatam

Forde was then given a detachment of troops and ordered to drive the French from Masulipatam. He was badly supported by a local ally Anandraz but still managed to rout the French force at the Battle of Condore and overrun their camp, before laying siege to Masulipatem itself. His forces then stormed the town on 25 January 1759 losing a third of their number. He was widely commended for his leadership during the campaign.

Chinsurah
Later that year he returned to Bengal and won the Battle of Chinsurah removing the Dutch threat to British power in Bengal.

Later life
Despite these twin victories, Forde's brevet promotion to Lieutenant Colonel was not initially ratified by the East India Company. It was only with the personal intervention of Clive that he was eventually given a formal promotion. He then returned to Ireland for several years, where he lived in Johnstown in County Meath.

In 1769 he was sent out as part of a three-man committee, with Henry Vansittart and Luke Scrafton, to investigate the East India Company's practices.  They set sail in the frigate Aurora in September 1769. The vessel left the Cape of Good Hope on 27 December 1769, but the ship disappeared en route to India and he was believed drowned with the rest of the passengers and crew.  The captain had decided to navigate the Mozambique Channel despite bad weather.

Colonel Forde married Margaret, daughter of Thomas Bowerbank. His son, Robert Forde succeeded to the property at Johnstown in Co. Meath and later became MP for the county.

See also
 Great Britain in the Seven Years War
 List of people who disappeared mysteriously at sea

References

Bibliography
 Harvey, Robert. Clive: The Life and Death of a British Emperor. Sceptre, 1999.
 Henty, George Alfred. With Clive in India. Or, The Beginnings of an Empire. 
 Keay, John. The Honourable Company: A History of the English East India Company. Harper Collins, 1993

1718 births
1760s missing person cases
1770 deaths
18th-century Irish people
39th Regiment of Foot officers
Alumni of Trinity College Dublin
British Army personnel of the War of the Austrian Succession
British East India Company Army officers
British military personnel of the Seven Years' War
Irish soldiers in the British Army
Irish soldiers in the British East India Company Army
Military personnel from County Down
People lost at sea